Topulli is a surname of Albanian origin. Notable people with the surname include:

Bajo Topulli (1868–1930), Albanian nationalist politician and revolutionary
Çerçiz Topulli (1880–1915), Albanian revolutionary and guerrilla fighter

See also
Çerçiz Topulli Square, town square in Gjirokastër, Albania

Albanian-language surnames